Renée Lynn Vicary (June 12, 1957 – February 18, 2002) was an American competitive female bodybuilder from Erie, Pennsylvania.

Contest history
1988 Powerhouse Natural Classic - 1st (HW & Overall)
1990 NPC USA Championships - 14th (HW)

External links 
Contest history at MuscleMemory.com

1957 births
2002 deaths
American female bodybuilders
20th-century American women